Abraxas consputa is a moth in the family Geometridae. It is endemic to Taiwan.

References

Abraxini
Moths of Taiwan
Endemic fauna of Taiwan
Moths described in 1909
Taxa named by Max Bastelberger